James Sutton (born 1986 in United Kingdom), known as Jam Sutton, is an English visual artist.

Career
Sutton's clients include will.i.am, Natalia Kills, Steve Aoki, Keri Hilson, Space Cowboy, Master Shortie, Ministry of Sound, The Fratellis, Pharrell Williams's band N*E*R*D and labels Cherrytree Records (Interscope/Universal), Sony Music.

Jam's work has been published and displayed throughout the world in exhibitions, magazines, album artwork, television broadcasts and blogs (Hypebeast / Kanye West / Flylyf / Grafik Mag). He has also taken part in  shows in the UK, Italy and Spain.

This Is Not Clothing
Jam Sutton is the founder and main designer for a line of clothing ranging from surrealism to pop art.  WUW magazine said: "James has worked on a streetwear clothing line which is already creating a buzz behind the scenes".

Awards

He earned two commendations at the D&AD (Design & Art Direction) Student awards held in London in 2007
In 2007, he was a finalist in the category of "Live Motion" at the Adobe Design Achievement Awards held in San Francisco. 
Awarded an honorary membership to the International Society of Typographic Designers, following recognition at the ISTD Awards 2007.

Exhibitions

Solo 

 Coventry - Photo Show - Venice Fashion Photography (May 2007)
 Apo + Theo + Osis - Photo Show -  Taller de Marcs - Barcelona, Spain (September 2012)
 Looking back, seeing forward. - Artwork Show -  Glassworks - Amsterdam, Netherlands (July 2015)

Design

2008: will.i.am - "New Day" (graphical post production) (Interscope)
2011: Frankmusik - Do It in the AM - Album cover and artwork Island Records
2011: N*E*R*D - Nothing - Album cover, photography and visual art (Star Trak Entertainment, Interscope Records)

Music videos

2007: The Fratellis - "Flathead" (CherryTree Records Interscope Records)
2007: Space Cowboy "Running Away" (Tiger Trax)
2008: Natalia Cappuccini - "Real Woman" (Interscope)
2009: Steve Aoki ft. Zuper Blahq - "I'm In The House" (Dim Mak Ministry of Sound)
2009: Master Shortie - "Bringing It Back" (Odd One Out Music)
2010: Natalia Kills - "Love, Kills xx" Episodes 1, 2 + 3 (Season 2) (Interscope)
2011: Zuper Blahq AKA will.i.am - "Dance" (will.i.am Music Group)
2012: Steve Aoki ft. Kid Cudi & Travis Barker - "Cudi The Kid" (Ultra Records)
2013: Azealia Banks - "Yung Rapunxel"

References

External links
 
 This Is Not Clothing

1986 births
Living people
Photographers from Warwickshire
English music video directors
Artists from Coventry
Alumni of Coventry University